Evans station is a light rail station on the Muni Metro T Third Street line, located in the median of 3rd Street at Evans Avenue in the Bayview neighborhood of San Francisco, California. The station opened with the T Third Street line on January 13, 2007. It has two side platforms; the northbound platform is north of Evans Avenue, and the southbound platform south of Evans Avenue so that trains can pass through the intersection before the station stop.

References

External links 

SFMTA: Third Street & Evans Ave northbound, southbound
SF Bay Transit (unofficial): Third Street & Evans Ave

Muni Metro stations
Railway stations in the United States opened in 2007